Melissa Hart may refer to:

Melissa Hart (actress), American stage actress
Melissa Hart (judge), American judge on Colorado Supreme Court
Melissa Hart (politician) (born 1962), American politician
Melissa Joan Hart (born 1976), American film and television actress